The Afshars of Urmia (also spelled Urmiya) are a branch of the Afshar tribe centered in the Iranian city of Urmia. From 1624/25 to 1820/21, the governorship of Urmia was mainly in the hands of the Urmia Afshars. After that, only a few them served as its governor, the last one being Imam Quli Khan, who became governor in 1879/80.

Many of the Afshar governors of Urmia bore the prominent title of beglarbeg, i.e. governor-general.

History 
Fath-Ali Khan Afshar was in power from 1747 to 1748, and again from 1757 until 1762. Shortly after coming to power, he was expelled by Mehdi Khan Afshar, who was then appointed governor by Ebrahim Shah. However, Mehdi Khan Afshar was then overthrown by Azad Khan Afghan, and Fath 'Ali Khan became his deputy. In the aftermath of Nader Shah's death, the khans of Urmia were able to expand to control practically all the lands of Azerbaijan.

After the fall of Azad Khan Afghan, the people of Tabriz invited Fath 'Ali Khan to become the new ruler. In 1759, Fath 'Ali Khan marched onto Karabakh Khanate, which resulted in 6 months long siege and ultimately, Panah Ali Khan, khan of Karabakh Khanate, accepting to be the dependency of Fath-Ali. Panah Ali Khan's son Ibrahim Khalil Khan was taken hostage after the siege.

In 1761 Karim Khan Zand and Panah Ali Khan's combined forces marched onto Urmia, which resulted in Fath-Ali retreating to the city of Urmia. In May 1762, Karim Khan Zand struck again by capturing the city of Maragha and later sieging the city of Urmia for 9 months, which resulted in it being captured. Fath-Ali was hanged in Shiraz in 1763.

After Fath-'Ali Khan's death, Rustam Khan Afshar succeeded him. In 1768, he was succeeded by Reza Qoli Khan Afshar. In 1772 he was succeeded by Imam Qoli Khan Afshar. After the death of Karim Khan Zand in 1779, Imam Qoli Khan Afshar expanded Urmia once again. It is said that he received taxes from Savojbulagh, Senneh, Maragheh, Tabriz, and Khoy. However, eventually in 1783 the Zand leader 'Ali Morad Khan Zand sent an army to defeat Imam Qoli Khan Afshar. He succeeded in killing the khan and installing Amir Aslam Khan Afshar on the throne as a Zand puppet, but a few months later Mohammad Qoli Khan Afshar overthrew him with the support of the Afshar chieftains.

Eventually in 1824 the governor  of Urmia was extinguished as the Afshars lost control of the governorship, but the Afshars continued to play an important role in the politics of Urmia.

List of governors of Urmia from 1624/25 to 1879/80 
The governors of Urmia from 1624/25 to 1879/80 were the following;

References

Sources
 
 
  
 
 

 
Urmia
Vassal and tributary states of the Zand dynasty
1747 establishments in Asia
1865 disestablishments in Asia
States and territories established by the Afshar tribe